Markopoulos (Greek: Μαρκόπουλος) is a Greek surname, which means son of Mark. The female version of the name is Markopoulou. Notable examples include:

Men 
Evan Markopoulos (born 1994), American professional wrestler 
Giorgos Markopoulos (born 1951), Greek poet
Gregory Markopoulos (1928-1992), American filmmaker
John Markopoulos (1951-2004), Greek businessman
Panos P. Markopoulos, Greek scholar and university professor of electrical engineering 
Soulis Markopoulos (born 1949), Greek basketball coach
Xenofon Markopoulos
Yannis Markopoulos (born 1939), Greek composer

Women 
Athina Markopoulou, Greek-American engineer
Fotini Markopoulou-Kalamara (born 1971), Greek physicist

See also
Harry Markopolos
Limin Markopoulou
Markopoulo (disambiguation)

Greek-language surnames
Surnames